Agen station (French: Gare d'Agen) is a railway station in Agen, Nouvelle-Aquitaine, France. The station was opened in 1856 and is located on the Bordeaux–Sète railway, Niversac-Agen railway and Agen-Auch railway, which is used for freight. The station is served by TGV (high speed), Intercités (long distance, also night trains) and TER (local) services operated by SNCF.

Train services
The following services currently call at Agen:
high speed services (TGV) Paris - Tours - Bordeaux - Toulouse
intercity services (Intercités) Bordeaux - Toulouse - Montpellier - Marseille
local service (TER Nouvelle-Aquitaine) Bordeaux - Langon - Marmande - Agen
local service (TER Nouvelle-Aquitaine) Périgueux - Le Buisson - Monsempron-Libos - Agen
local service (TER Occitanie) Agen - Montauban - Toulouse

See also 

 List of SNCF stations in Nouvelle-Aquitaine

References

Railway stations in Lot-et-Garonne
Railway stations in France opened in 1856
Agen